Yanbei is a town under the administration of Yongfeng County, Jiangxi, China. , it administers Jiangkou Residential Community and the following 12 villages:
Jiantian Village
Jijiang Village
Shuidong Village
Luxia Village
Tujia Village
Xiapao Village
Pengxi Village
Jiantou Village
Chijiang Village
Gubei Village
Huibei Village
Maojia Village

References 

Township-level divisions of Jiangxi
Yongfeng County